The Director is a theatrical play by Nancy Hasty that debuted in 2000 at the Arclight Theatre. It ran from February 15 to July 1, 2000.

Plot
Peter, a highly demanding with borderline personality who believes is creating avant-garde theatre. Being a bastard yet charming, he has been reduced to a janitor in a rehearsal studio and it works well for him because he can use the stage on the off hours. He then beguiles his unfortunate actors into playing a series of appalling acting experiences that gradually become more demented and eventually out of control.

Cast
Directed by Evan Bergman, set design by John Farrell, lighting design by Steve Rust,  costumes by Jill Kliber and produced by Laine Valentino. Starring John Shea as Peter, Tasha Lawrence as the playwright who persuades Peter to direct her play, and Tanya Clarke, Todd Simmons, Shula Van Buren and Warren Press as the studio actors.

Incidental music was Rachmaninoff's Concerto #2.

References

Off-Broadway plays
American plays
2000 plays